Grégory Carraz (born 9 April 1975) is a retired professional French tennis player. During his career, he reached one ATP Tour doubles final.

Career finals

Doubles: 1 (1 runner-up)

Challengers and Futures finals

Singles: 14 (7–7)

Doubles: 13 (6–7)

External links
 
 

1975 births
Living people
French male tennis players
Sportspeople from Boulogne-Billancourt
People from Bourgoin-Jallieu
Tennis players at the 2004 Summer Olympics
Sportspeople from Isère
Olympic tennis players of France